Carrott is the surname of:
Bryan Carrott, American jazz musician
Jasper Carrott (b. 1945), English comedian and television personality
Josh Carrott, English YouTuber also known as Korean Englishman
Peggy Carrott, competitor at the 1961 Women's British Open Squash Championship
Ric Carrott (b. 1949), American television and movie actor

See also
Carrot (disambiguation)